Pilar, Portuguese and Spanish for pillar, may refer to:

People
 Pilar (given name), a common abbreviation of María del Pilar, including a list of people so named
 Pilar (surname), a list of people surnamed Pilar or del Pilar

Places

Argentina
 Barrio El Pilar, a village and municipality in Río Negro Province
 Pilar, Buenos Aires Province
 Pilar, Córdoba Province
 Pilar Partido, a partido located in Greater Buenos Aires in Buenos Aires Province

Brazil
 Pilar, Alagoas
 Pilar, Paraíba
 Pilar de Goiás, Goiás
 Pilar do Sul, São Paulo

Philippines
 Pilar, Abra, a 5th class municipality
 Pilar, Bataan, a 3rd class municipality
 Pilar, Bohol, a 4th class municipality
 Pilar, Capiz, a 4th class municipality
 Pilar, Cebu, a 5th class municipality
 Pilar, Sorsogon, a 1st class municipality
 Pilar, Surigao del Norte, a 5th class municipality

Elsewhere
 El Pilar, an ancient Mayan city center on the Belize-Guatemala border
 Pilar da Bretanha, a civil parish on the island of São Miguel, in the Azores
 Pilar de la Horadada, a town and district in the Province of Alicante, Spain
 Pilar, Goa, India
 Pilar, New Mexico, United States
 Pilar, Paraguay

Other uses
 Pilar (boat), Ernest Hemingway's boat, also the protagonist in his novel For Whom the Bell Tolls and his nickname for second wife Pauline Pfeiffer
 Pilar College, in Zamboanga City, Philippines
 Pilar tuco-tuco, a species of rodent in the family Ctenomyidae
 Fort Pilar, a 17th-century military defence fortress in Zamboanga City, Philippines
 Our Lady of the Pillar (Nuestra Señora del Pilar or María del Pilar), the name given to the Virgin Mary for her appearance in Spain, where she is commonly depicted as standing on top of a pillar
 Treaty of Pilar, a pact signed among the rulers of the Argentine provinces of Santa Fe, Entre Ríos and Buenos Aires
 In medicine and healthcare and anatomy and physiology, pilar means a hair, or something hair-like or having to do with hair; see pilar cyst

See also
 Pilars (disambiguation), a disambiguation page
 Pillar (disambiguation)	
 Pila (disambiguation)